Justo Meza (Chinese: 梅萨; born 20 September 1979 in Paraguay) is a Paraguayan retired footballer.

China

Introduced at Shanghai Shenhua mid-season 2008 despite coach Wu Jingui not regarding him as a prototypical forward, Meza debuted as they took on Guangzhou, but did not perform to expectations in his first two appearances, with new manager Jia Xiuquan asking fans to be patient with the Paraguayan. However, even though he broke his duck with a header to take the lead over Zhejiang Greentown, which ended 2-2, Shenhua decided not to extended his contract that winter.

References

External links 
 Justo Rolando Meza podría ser contratado
 Justo R. Meza retorna al Auriazul
 Meza: "Trabajé mucho, porque no quería fracasar en el club"
 "Peque" Benítez y Justo Meza serán titulares
 Justo Meza: "Vamos a ganar y a echarle el invicto al rival"
 Justo Meza: "Me siento mejor en la delantera"
 Meza sigue sentido, pero aseguran que jugará
 Justo Meza: "No pudimos rematar el partido"
 
 

Paraguayan footballers
Association football forwards
Living people
1979 births
Paraguayan expatriate footballers
Expatriate footballers in China
Chinese Super League players
Expatriate footballers in Bolivia
Expatriate footballers in Guatemala
Club Presidente Hayes footballers
Shanghai Shenhua F.C. players
Sportivo Trinidense footballers
Club Bolívar players
Club Olimpia footballers
Sport Colombia footballers
12 de Octubre Football Club players